Seven Vengeful Women (Spanish: Las siete magníficas, Italian: 7 donne per una strage) is a 1966 western film directed by Rudolf Zehetgruber and Sidney W. Pink. It stars Anne Baxter, Maria Perschy and Gustavo Rojo. It was a co-production between Spain, Italy, Austria and Liechtenstein and was part of a string of Eurowesterns made during the decade.

It is also known by the alternative title Tall Women. In 1967 it was released in the United States by Allied Artists, after being dubbed into English.

Synopsis
Following an Apache attack on a wagon train, seven female survivors who had sheltered in a cave try to make their way to safety. They are joined by a cavalry scout who is the lone survivor of an ambush of an army patrol in the area.

Cast
 Anne Baxter as Mary Ann  
 Maria Perschy as Ursula  
 Gustavo Rojo as Gus Macintosh 
 Rossella Como as Katy Grimaldi
 Adriana Ambesi as Betty Grimaldi  
 Christa Linder as Bridget  
 Luis Prendes as Pope  
 Mara Cruz as Blanche  
 Perla Cristal as Pilar  
 María Mahor as Dorothy 
 John Clark as Col. Howard 
 Dorit Dom
 Fernando Hilbeck as White Cloud  
 Renate Lanz
 Valentino Macchi 
 Franco Mariotti 
 Alejandra Nilo as White Cloud's squaw 
 George Rigaud 
 Mila Stanic

References

Bibliography
 Thomas Weisser. Spaghetti Westerns: the Good, the Bad and the Violent. McFarland, 2005.

External links
 

1966 films
1966 Western (genre) films
Spaghetti Western films
Austrian Western (genre) films
Spanish Western (genre) films
English-language Austrian films
English-language Spanish films
English-language Italian films
1960s Spanish-language films
Films directed by Rudolf Zehetgruber
Films shot in Almería
Films scored by Gregorio García Segura
Films produced by Sidney W. Pink
1960s Italian films